Primorskyibacter insulae is a Gram-negative, aerobic and non-spore-forming bacterium from the genus of Primorskyibacter.

References 

Rhodobacteraceae
Bacteria described in 2015